The Hypoptinae are a subfamily of the family Cossidae (carpenter or goat moths).

Genera
 Acousmaticus Butler, 1882
 Breyeriana Orfila, 1957
 Givarbela Clench, 1957
 Givira Walker, 1856
 Hypopta Hübner, 1820
 Inguromorpha H.Edwards, 1888 (tentatively placed here)
 Langsdorfia Hübner, [1821]
 Philiodoron Clench, 1957
 Psychogena Schaus, 1911
 Puseyia Dyar, 1937

Former genera
 Philanglaus Butler, 1882
 Pomeria Barnes & McDunnough, 1911

References

Natural History Museum Lepidoptera generic names catalog

 
Moth subfamilies